Marlon Stewart (born March 16, 1985) is an American basketball coach who is currently an assistant coach of Oregon State Beavers under current head coach, Wayne Tinkle.

Career 
In 2008, Stewart started his professional coaching duties with California Golden Bears. He also became the video coordinator for head coach Mike Montgomery.

In July 2017, it was announced that Stewart would be part of the coaching staff of the Hawaii Rainbow Warriors.

In 2018, Stewart has been named as the director of basketball operations of Oregon State Beavers. The following year, it has been announced that he would become a part of the coaching staff of Wayne Tinkle, wherein he would become an assistant.

In 2021, he was awarded as a recipient of the "Rising Coach Lifetime Award" by Rising Coaches.

References

External links
Marlon Stewart Coaching profile

1985 births
Living people
American men's basketball coaches
American men's basketball players
Basketball coaches from Washington (state)
California Golden Bears men's basketball coaches
Guards (basketball)
Oregon State Beavers men's basketball coaches